Mick is a masculine given name or nickname, usually a short form (hypocorism) of Michael. Because of its popularity in Ireland, it is often used in England, the United Kingdom in general, English-speaking North America, and Australia as a derogatory term or ethnic slur for an Irish person or a person of Irish descent, particularly ethnic Irish Catholics. In Australia, the meaning also broadened to include any Roman Catholic. A colloquial but possibly false etymology also attributes the origin of the anti-Irish slur to the prevalence of Irish surnames containing the patronymic prefix “Mc-” (or Mhic); whether this patronym significantly contributed to the development of the  ethnic slur is debated, but the prevalence of the first name or nickname “Mick” among Irish people is considered by etymologists to be the primary origin of the slur.

People
 Mick Abrahams (born 1943), English guitarist and band leader, original guitarist for Jethro Tull
 Mick Aston (1946-2013), English archaeologist
 Mick Batyske, aka Mick (DJ), American DJ
 Mick Brown, half of the British vocal duo Pat and Mick
 Mick Coady (born 1958), English footballer
 Michael Collins (Irish leader) (1890–1922), Irish revolutionary leader, soldier, and politician
 Mick Cronin (basketball) (born 1971), American basketball coach
 Mick Fanning (born 1981), Australian professional surfer
 Mick Foley (born 1965), American professional wrestler, actor and author
 Mick Fleetwood (born 1947), British drummer and founding member of Fleetwood Mac
 Mick Gadsby (born 1947), English footballer
 Michael Hannah (born 1983), Australian downhill mountain biker
 Mick Harvey (born 1958), Australian musician, singer-songwriter, composer, arranger and record producer
 Mick Herron, British mystery and thriller novelist
 Mick Hucknall (born 1960), English singer and songwriter
 Mick Jagger (born 1943), lead singer and songwriter for the Rolling Stones
 Mick Jenkins (rugby league) (born 1972), Welsh rugby footballer
 Mick Jenkins (rapper) (born 1991), American rapper
 Mick Jones (disambiguation)
 Mick McGinley (born 1940/1), Irish Gaelic footballer and father of professional golfer Paul
 Mick Mannock (1887–1918), British First World War fighter ace
 Mickey Mantle (1931-1995), American Major League Baseball Hall-of-Fame player nicknamed "the Mick"
 Mick Mars (born 1951 or 1955), guitarist for Mötley Crüe born Robert Alan Deal
 Mick Mercer (born 1958), British journalist
 Mick Molloy (born 1966), Australian comedian, writer, producer and actor
 Mick Molloy (born 1944), Irish former rugby union player
 Mick Mulvaney (born 1967), American politician
 Mick Peck (born 1981), New Zealand magician
 Michael Potter (born 1963), Australian rugby league coach and former player
 Mick Ralphs (born 1944), English guitarist and songwriter, founding member of rock bands Mott the Hoople and Bad Company
 Mick Ronson (1946-1993), English guitarist for David Bowie's The Spiders from Mars
 Mick Schumacher (born 1999), German racing driver and son of former F1 champion Michael Schumacher
 Mick Taylor (born 1949), English guitarist for the Rolling Stones
 Mick Thomson (born 1973), American guitarist for Slipknot
 Mick Tongraya (born 1992), Thai actor and model

Fictional characters
 Mick Belker, on the TV series Hill Street Blues
 Mick Carter, on the British soap opera EastEnders
 Michael "Crocodile" Dundee, in the Crocodile Dundee film series
 Mick Garvey, on the TV series Benidorm
 Mick Kanic, on the Power Rangers Ninja Steel
 Mick Kelly, in the 1940 novel The Heart Is a Lonely Hunter and the 1968 film adaptation

See also
 The Mick (disambiguation)
 Mickey (disambiguation)
 MIC (disambiguation)
 Micky
 Micki
 Taking the mick

Masculine given names
Hypocorisms
Pejorative terms for European people